Sayada is a town and commune in Mostaganem Province, Algeria. It is located in Kheïr Eddine District. According to the 1998 census it has a population of 21,900.

References

Communes of Mostaganem Province
Cities in Algeria